Acer crassum is an uncommon Asian species of maple. It has been found only in the Province of Yunnan in southwestern China.

Acer crassum is a small tree up to 12 meters tall. Leaves are non-compound, thick and leathery, lance-shaped, up to 14 cm long and 6 cm across, no lobes or teeth.

References

External links
line drawing for Flora of China, figure 571, drawings 1 + 2 at top

crassum
Plants described in 1948
Flora of Yunnan